"The Entertainer" is a 1902 classic piano rag written by Scott Joplin. 

It was sold first as sheet music by John Stark & Son of St. Louis, Missouri, and in the 1910s as piano rolls that would play on player pianos. The first recording was by blues and ragtime musicians the Blue Boys in 1928, played on mandolin and guitar.

As one of the classics of ragtime, it returned to international prominence as part of the ragtime revival in the 1970s, when it was used as the theme music for the 1973 Oscar-winning film The Sting. Composer and pianist Marvin Hamlisch's adaptation reached No. 3 on the Billboard pop chart and spent a week at No. 1 on the easy listening chart in 1974. The Sting was set in the 1930s, a full generation after the end of ragtime's mainstream popularity, thus giving the inaccurate impression that ragtime music was popular at that time.

The Recording Industry Association of America ranked it at No. 10 on its "Songs of the Century" list.

Music
"The Entertainer" is sub-titled "A Rag Time Two Step", which was a form of dance popular until about 1911, and a style which was common among rags written at the time.

Its structure is: Intro–AA–BB–A–CC–Intro2–DD.

It is primarily set in the key of C major; however, for the C section (commonly referred to as the "Trio"), it modulates to F major, then shifts back to C major for the D section. The B section contains an indication that the melody is to be played an octave higher on the repeat.

In the June 7, 1903, St. Louis Globe-Democrat, contemporary composer Monroe H. Rosenfeld described "The Entertainer" as "the best and most euphonious" of Joplin's compositions to that point. "It is a jingling work of a very original character, embracing various strains of a retentive character which set the foot in spontaneous action and leave an indelible imprint on the tympanum". Joplin may have performed the piece at a fundraiser in Parsons, Kansas, on April 27, 1904.

Suggested by the rag's dedication to "James Brown and his Mandolin Club", author Rudi Blesh wrote that "some of the melodies recall the pluckings and the fast tremolos of the little steel-stringed plectrum instruments". Stark issued an arrangement of the piece for two mandolins and a guitar.

Publication
The copyright on "The Entertainer" was registered December 29, 1902, along with two other Joplin rags, "A Breeze from Alabama" and "Elite Syncopations", all three of which were published by Stark. The centerpiece of the original cover art featured a minstrel show caricature of a black man in formal attire on a theater stage.

Popularity and legacy
In November 1970, Joshua Rifkin released a recording called Scott Joplin: Piano Rags on the classical label Nonesuch, which featured as its second track "The Entertainer". It sold 100,000 copies in its first year and eventually became Nonesuch's first million-selling record. The Billboard Best-Selling Classical LPs chart for September 28, 1974, has the record at No. 5, with the follow-up, Volume 2, at No. 4, and a combined set of both volumes at No. 3. Separately both volumes had been on the chart for sixty-four weeks. The album was nominated in 1971 for two Grammy Award categories, Best Album Notes and Best Instrumental Soloist Performance (without orchestra), but at the ceremony on March 14, 1972, Rifkin did not win in any category. In 1979 Alan Rich in the New York Magazine wrote that by giving artists like Rifkin the opportunity to put Joplin's music on disk, Nonesuch Records "created, almost alone, the Scott Joplin revival".

Marvin Hamlisch lightly adapted and orchestrated Joplin's music for the 1973 film The Sting, for which he won an Academy Award for Best Original Song Score and Adaptation on April 2, 1974. His version of "The Entertainer" reached No. 3 on the Billboard Hot 100 on May 18, 1974, prompting The New York Times to write, "the whole nation has begun to take notice". Thanks to the film and its score, Joplin's work became appreciated in both the popular and classical music worlds, becoming (in the words of music magazine Record World), the "classical phenomenon of the decade". In the United States, "The Entertainer" is one of many songs commonly played by ice cream trucks to attract attention.

See also
 List of compositions by Scott Joplin
 List of Billboard Easy Listening number ones of 1974

References

Sources

External links

 
 Musical score and MIDI file at the Mutopia Project
 Sheet music and mp3 at mfiles.co.uk (interactive version requires Sibelius Scorch)
 Free MP3 download and video
 Free typeset sheet music from Cantorion.org

Compositions for solo piano
1902 compositions
1973 singles
Cashbox number-one singles
Rags by Scott Joplin
Compositions in C major